The 2025 Rugby World Cup will be the tenth edition of the women's Rugby World Cup, as organized by World Rugby. It is scheduled to be held in England.

It will be the second women's Rugby Union World Cup to be hosted by England, after the 2010 edition. It will be the fifth hosted in the British Isles.

The tournament will be expanded to 16 teams, from the 12 which participated in 2021.

New Zealand enter the tournament as defending champions following their victory against a 14-player England in the 2021 Rugby World Cup Final.

Host selection 
On 13 August 2020 World Rugby announced that the hosting rights to the next two world cups, men and women's, would be selected during the same process. These were the 2027 and 2031 men's tournaments and the 2025 and 2029 women's tournaments. The RFU confirmed their intent to bid for the 2025 tournament in October 2021.

World Rugby awarded England preferred candidate status for the 2025 tournament in November 2021. England were confirmed as hosts on 13 May 2022.

Qualifying 
The qualification pathway for the competition was confirmed in January 2021. 

Tournament hosts England qualify automatically. They will be joined by the teams which reached the semi-final stage of the 2021 Rugby World Cup, who also qualified automatically. 

Five places will be decided via regional qualifying competitions: one each for Africa, Oceania, Asia, South America and Europe. One place will also be decided by the results of the Pacific Fours cross regional competition.

The remaining six places will be awarded via the WXV competition, which will begin in 2023. These places will be awarded to the highest ranked teams which have not yet qualified by any other method.

References

 
2025 rugby union tournaments for national teams
2025 in women's rugby union
2025
World Cup 2025
World Cup